M. J. Farrell may refer to:

Michael James Farrell (born 1926, died 1975), British economist
Molly Keane (born 1904 died 1996), Irish novelist and playwright.